Marion Bachrach (1898–1957) was the sister of John Abt and also a member of the Ware group, a group of government employees in the New Deal administration of President Franklin D. Roosevelt who were also members of the secret apparatus of the Communist Party of the United States (CPUSA) in the 1930s.

Career
Bachrach was the personal secretary and congressional office manager to Representative John Bernard of the Minnesota Farmer-Labor Party in 1937-1938.  Bachrach also was a correspondent for the newspaper PM.   

Membership and meeting of the Ware group were highly secretive, and many members eventually infiltrated into higher levels of the United States government during World War II. After Alger Hiss was cut out from closer contact with the Ware group, Hiss remained a close associate of Marion Bachrach.

On November 20, 1942 Soviet foreign intelligence (Dimitrov to Fitin, RTsKhIDNI 495-74-484) requested a background report on Bachrach from the Comintern and received a positive report.

On December 14, 1948, Bachrach testified in Washington, DC, before the House Un-American Activities Committee (HUAC); the next day in New York City, a federal grand jury indicted Alger Hiss on two counts of perjury in relation to the same line of evidence that HUAC was investigating.

In 1951, Bachrach was arrested but got out on bail.  (Her attorney was Harold I. Cammer, whose law partners included Nathan Witt and formerly included Lee Pressman, also both members of the Ware Group).  Cammer had represented Abt, Witt, and Pressman during the Hiss Case.)

Personal life

She married Howard Bachrach, who worked at the Agricultural Adjustment Administration.

Works

Bachrach wrote several tracts sold to Communist consumers.  Some original publications appear to be quite profitable among collectors and sellers.  Among them are Amnesty! Proposal of an amnesty program to release the members of the Communist Party imprisoned under the provisions of the Smith Act, This Obvious Violence, You Are on Trial and The Federal Grand Jury is Stacked Against You.

See also

 John Abt
 Ware Group

References

Sources
 Harvey Klehr, John Earl Haynes, and Fridrikh Igorevich Firsov, The Secret World of American Communism (New Haven: Yale University Press, 1995).  
 John Earl Haynes and Harvey Klehr, Venona: Decoding Soviet Espionage in America (New Haven: Yale University Press, 1999).  
 FBI Silvermaster File

American communists
1898 births
1957 deaths